DPT may refer to:

Science and medicine
Dpt (unit) (dioptre/diopter), most commonly a unit measuring refraction and power  in a lens or curved mirror
Dermatopontin, a human extracellular matrix protein
Dipropyltryptamine, a psychedelic tryptamine
DPT vaccine, vaccine against diphtheria, pertussis and tetanus
Doctor of Physical Therapy
Distributed Processing Technology
Dynamic Packet Transport

Politics
Democratic Party of Turkmenistan
Democratic peace theory, in political science 
Druk Phuensum Tshogpa, a political party in Bhutan

Entertainment
Dumbarton People's Theatre, a Scottish theatre group
Dirty Pretty Things (band), an English band founded in 2005
Dirty Pretty Things (film), a 2002 British drama

Transportation
DPT, the National Rail station code for Devonport railway station, Devon, England
Dublin Port Tunnel

Other
A department